Mount Paatusoq, also known as 'Mount Patuersoq', is the highest mountain in the Kujalleq municipality, SE Greenland.

Paatusoq is also the highest peak in the King Frederick VI Coast area of far southeastern Greenland.

History
Long considered the highest unclimbed peak in remote southeastern Greenland, Mt Paatusoq was finally climbed in 1966 by Austrian alpinist Toni Dürnberger in very difficult conditions. Some of the team members fell into a crevasse and one of them was seriously injured. Dürnberger had previously led the 1962 Austro-German Greenland Expedition (Österreichische Deutsche Grönland Expedition 1962) that had climbed unscaled peaks in the Sermilik area from April to July 1962.

Geography
Rising on the northern side of the inner end of Paatusoq fjord Mount Paatusoq is an isolated peak in a remote and uninhabited location. This mighty mountain rises steeply from the glacier located north of the nunatak at the glacier confluence that has its terminus in Paatusoq fjord 10 km to the ESE.

This mountain is marked as a  peak in the Defense Mapping Agency Greenland Navigation charts and as a  mountain in other sources.

Geologically the western end of the range and the mountains in the nunatak south of it are part of the Paatusoq Syenite Complex.

See also
List of mountains in Greenland
List of Nunataks§Greenland
List of the ultra-prominent summits of North America
List of the major 100-kilometer summits of North America

References

External links
Greenland's Climate Change
JGS - Emplacement of rapakivi granite and syenite by floor depression and roof uplift in the Palaeoproterozoic Ketilidian orogen, South Greenland
JSTOR The Geographical Journal Vol. 130, No. 4 (Dec., 1964), pp. 572-574

Paatusoq
Kujalleq
Nunataks of Greenland